Michael Nelson  (born 20 August 1967) is a contemporary British installation artist. He represented Britain at the Venice Biennale in 2011. Nelson has twice been nominated for the Turner Prize: first in 2001 (that year the prize was won by Martin Creed), and again in 2007 (when the winner was Mark Wallinger).

Education 
Nelson studied at University of Reading from 1986–1990 for a BA Fine Art. From 1992 to 1993 he studied at Chelsea College of Art and Design for an MA Sculpture.

Working practice

Nelson's installations always only exist for the time period of the exhibition which they were made for. They are extended labyrinths, which the viewer is free to find their own way through, and in which the locations of the exit and entrance are often difficult to determine.  His "The Deliverance and the Patience" in a former brewery on the Giudecca was in the 2001 Venice Biennale. In September 2007, his exhibition A Psychic Vacuum was held in the old Essex Street Market, New York. Essays on Nelson's projects, '24A Orwell Street King's Cross Sydney' and 'The Deliverance and the Patience' have been written by artist/curator Richard Grayson.

His major installation The Coral Reef (2000), was on display at Tate Britain until the end of 2011. It consists of fifteen rooms and a warren of corridors. This work and its showing at Matt's Gallery earned him his 2001 Turner Prize nomination.

His piece Untitled (public sculpture for a redundant space) won the Royal Academy of Arts Wollaston Award in 2018, for most distinguished work in the Summer Exhibition. 

In 2019, from March to October, he transformed the Duveen Galleries in Tate Britain with his new installation called 'The Asset Strippers', a collection of objects from post-war Britain that framed his childhood.

His work has been collected by Hayward Gallery, British Council, Poju Zabludowicz, Tate, MAMCO and Moderna Museet .

See also
Turner Prize
Young British Artists
British art

Notes and references

External links
Malmö Konsthall: Mike Nelson, 2012
303 Gallery: Mike Nelson (303 Gallery)
Matt's Gallery: Mike Nelson
Galleria Franco Noero: Mike Nelson
Creative Time: Mike Nelson, 2007
Frieze Art Fair: Mike Nelson commission, 2006
Mike Nelson's A Psychic Vacuum in New York City, September 2007
Kristin M. Jones, Review of A Psychic Vacuum, Frieze, November-December 2011
Michele Robecchi, Interview with Mike Nelson, Flash Art, October 2008
Sean O'Hagan, Interview with Mike Nelson, Guardian 23 September 2007
Dan Fox, Review of Modern Art Oxford show, Frieze, September 2004
Adrian Searle, Review of Modern Art Oxford show, Guardian, 11 May 2004
 Profile on Royal Academy of Arts Collections

Living people
British conceptual artists
British installation artists
Alumni of Chelsea College of Arts
People educated at Loughborough Grammar School
1967 births
English contemporary artists
Royal Academicians